Manolo Pestrin (born 13 October 1978) is an Italian footballer who plays as a midfielder for Serie D club San Marino Calcio, where he is the captain.

Career
Born in Rome, capital of Italy and Lazio region, Pestrin started his career at Roman club Monterotondo. He was signed by Lanciano in 2000. In January 2003 Pestrin left for Palermo, which 6 months later he was signed by Cesena in co-ownership deal.

Pestrin spent  seasons in the Romagna club. In January 2007 Pestrin left for Messina in temporary deal. In mid-2007 Messina signed him outright. However the club bankrupted in 2008. He joined Salernitana as free agent.

In January 2011 Pestrin was signed by Frosinone, with Salvatore Aurelio moved to opposite direction. In 2011, he was swapped with Matías Miramontes.

In 2012, he was signed by Carrarese. In 2013, he was signed by Ascoli. On 30 January 2014 he returned to Salernitana.

References

External links

1978 births
Living people
Italian footballers
S.S. Virtus Lanciano 1924 players
Palermo F.C. players
A.C. Cesena players
A.C.R. Messina players
U.S. Salernitana 1919 players
A.S.D. Castel di Sangro Calcio players
Torino F.C. players
Frosinone Calcio players
U.S. Cremonese players
Carrarese Calcio players
Ascoli Calcio 1898 F.C. players
Serie A players
Serie B players
Association football midfielders
Footballers from Rome
Pol. Monterotondo Lupa players